Vukozi Bamuza (born 23 June 1991) is a South African first-class cricketer. He is  right-handed batsman and a right-arm fast medium bowler. He made his First Class debut for Free State against Western Province

References

External links
 

1991 births
Living people
South African cricketers
Sportspeople from the Free State (province)